R128 or R 128 may refer to:  

 EBU R 128 recommendation for loudness management
 House R 128, a modernist house in Germany by architect Werner Sobek
 R128 road (Ireland), a regional road in Fingal, Ireland